Anil Chatterjee (also Chattopadhyay, ; 25 October 1929 – 17 March 1996) was an Indian actor in the Bengali cinema during the early fifties through the mid-nineties and is mostly remembered as a character actor. He acted or performed in about 150 movies, including a few in Hindi. He played different shades, though mostly as a character actor, as well as in leading roles and at times as an antagonist, despite the limited opportunities he received. Irrespective of the roles, he left an indelible impression on the viewers and the critics. He also acted in the leading role in a tele-serial named Naqab in the national network of Doordarshan. He is one of the very few selected actors who worked with Satyajit Ray, Ritwik Ghatak, Tapan Sinha and Mrinal Sen; with the first three directors, he performed with on more than a number of occasions. His performance in the title role of the film Deshbandhu Chittaranjan [a biopic on the noted and revered freedom-fighter and barrister Chittaranjan Das (1870–1925), who was conferred the title of "Deshbandhu (Friend of the Country)"] won the appreciation of Basanti Devi, the wife of the "Deshbandhu" (she is said to have personally blessed the actor).

Born at Balagarh, near Jirat, Hooghly, India, he hailed from Calcutta, West Bengal, India, was graduated from St. Xavier's College, Kolkata - the institution to which he remained attached all through as an office-bearer and member of The Alumnoram Soceitas (Alumni Society) of the college. Prior to that, he completed his schooling from Delhi, having stood first in entire North India in the Senior Cambridge Examinations. In his college days, he became associated with Utpal Dutt and acted in a number of plays. He was also a Member of the West Bengal Legislative Assembly [MLA], having won the by-election from the erstwhile Chowringhee Assembly Constituency as a Left Front supported Independent candidate.

Limited filmography

Awards
 BFJA Awards-Best Actor In Supporting Role for ""Agni Sanskar"" in 1962.
 BFJA Awards-Best Actor In Supporting Role for ""Sandhya Deeper Sikha"" in 1965.
 BFJA Awards-Best Actor In Supporting Role for ""Sagina Mahato"" in 1971.
 BFJA Awards-Best Actor In Supporting Role for ""Raja"" in 1976.

References

External links
 

Indian male film actors
1929 births
1996 deaths
Male actors in Bengali cinema
University of Calcutta alumni
20th-century Indian male actors